The 1993 Grambling State Tigers football team represented Grambling State University as a member of the Southwestern Athletic Conference (SWAC) during the 1993 NCAA Division I-AA football season. Led by 51st-year head coach Eddie Robinson, the Tigers compiled an overall record of 7–4 and a mark of 4–3 in conference play, and finished third in the SWAC.

Schedule

References

Grambling State
Grambling State Tigers football seasons
Grambling State Tigers football